Al Sobotka (born October 16, 1953) is the former building operations manager for Olympia Entertainment. His responsibilities included day-to-day operations at Little Caesars Arena. Sobotka was fired on March 30, 2022. He was also involved in the operations of Cobo Arena until Olympia Entertainment relinquished management in 2011 and Joe Louis Arena until it closed for good in 2017. Sobotka is known mostly for driving the Zamboni during Detroit Red Wings games for the past 30 years and for collecting the octopuses thrown on the ice during Red Wings playoff games. The official mascot of the Red Wings is named after Sobotka. Sobotka came in second with 97,261 votes in Zamboni News' 1999 Zamboni "Driver of the Year" Award.

Sobotka's role as Zamboni driver
Sobotka had been driving the Zamboni between periods at Joe Louis Arena for over 30 years until the arena's closure in the spring 2017 and currently drives the Zamboni between periods at the new Little Caesars Arena, beginning in the fall 2017. He is known for taking pride in his work, and he ensures that the arena's ice surface is of the highest quality. He said: "You know I'm particular, so if I see anything that's wrong -- a little chip of snow or something, you know, all that stuff matters a lot, 'cause a little snow can freeze and a guy hits it, never know what can happen, you know?" Brendan Shanahan said of Sobotka: "Al's very good and he takes it personally. I mean we see him a lot. Everybody knows Al. We're able to go out and make comments to him. He'll know when there's a tough night, you know, in the playoffs, or if it's a humid day and he'll respond accordingly. He'll ask the players after the game, 'What'd you think of the ice?'"

Detroit fans often arrive before game time to watch Sobotka prepare the ice for a game. Also, kids can compete to drive around with Sobotka between periods. They learn that driving a Zamboni is no simple task, and that ice preparation is both science and an art that can take years to perfect.

Sobotka started driving the Zamboni early in life, and when asked about his "dream job", he said: "It was just a job I got when I was in high school, and I kept at it, working in the maintenance department for a few years, [and] I still enjoy getting up in the morning. If you don't enjoy your work, it's hard getting up in the morning, you know?"

Dealing with octopi

Sobotka is also famous for being the employee responsible for handling any octopuses thrown on the ice during a game. Sobotka will grab the octopus with his bare hands and swing it around his head. He typically receives an appreciative cheer from the crowd for this response.

In the April 2006 edition of Sports Illustrated, Michael Farber wrote:

The first face-offs [of the Stanley Cup tournament] were in Ottawa and Detroit at 7:12 p.m., although the unofficial commencement occurred two minutes earlier when an octopus landed on the ice with a splat during 'The Star-Spangled Banner' at the Wings' Joe Louis Arena. Nothing screams 'playoffs' like a cephalopod. (The Red Wings' tradition began in 1952 when two fishmongers realized that the number of tentacles on an octopus matched the number of wins then necessary to win the Stanley Cup.) Octopus-tossing is officially proscribed, but arena superintendent Al Sobotka tacitly encourages it by twirling octopuses over his head as he chugs off the ice after cleaning them up. In this year's playoff innovation, some Oilers fans threw hunks of prime Alberta beef onto the ice in response.

Sobotka said in 1996 that an unofficial record of 54 octopuses were thrown during one game of the 1995 Stanley Cup final series between Detroit Red Wings and New Jersey Devils. He also stated that Detroit fans throw an average of 25 octopuses per playoff game. For his tireless efforts, the Red Wings named their octopus mascot "Al" after Sobotka.

According to NHL rules, if any fan throws an object on the ice in celebration, the supported team could be issued a delay of game penalty. However, the NHL tends to look the other way when Sobotka does his stuff. Frank Brown, the league's vice president for media relations, said in response: "Every so often, an octopus slips out of someone's hands, and Al is right there to take care of the matter. And he cannot be blamed if, as it tries to break free from Al's grasp, the octopus lifts Al's arm and twirls itself in the air."

In the 2008 playoffs, the NHL issued a warning that while they were fine with octopuses being thrown on the ice, the Red Wings would be fined $10,000 if Sobotka twirled the octopus in the air, as bits of the octopus were getting in the ice and on the opposing goaltender. However, it was announced on May 7, 2008, that the NHL would allow Sobotka to twirl the octopuses, provided that he does so only at the Zamboni gate and not on the ice surface.

References

External links

Detroit Red Wings personnel
Culture of Detroit
Living people
1953 births
American people of Slavic descent